Admiral Alan Gardner, 1st Baron Gardner (12 February 1742 – 1 January 1809), was a British Royal Navy officer and peer of the realm. He was regarded by some as one of the Georgian era's most dashing frigate captains and, ultimately, a respected senior admiral.

Naval career
Gardner joined the Royal Navy in 1755. Promoted to captain in 1766, his first command was the fireship . He commanded a number of frigates before being promoted to a ship of the line. 
In 1782 he commanded the 98-gun  at the Battle of the Saintes, and in 1786 as commodore of the Jamaica Station (consisting of HMS Europa and ), he suppressed smuggling in the Gulf of Mexico and ordered detailed hydrographic surveys of Caribbean locations of interest to the Navy. During this time, he commanded and probably mentored future famous officers such as George Vancouver, Peter Puget and Joseph Whidbey.

Gardner became a Member of Parliament for Plymouth in 1790 and later for Westminster in 1796. He was appointed to the Board of Admiralty in 1790 and was appointed commander-in-chief of the Leeward Islands Station in 1793. As rear admiral in November 1793, he was among the first officers to articulate a growing conviction in the navy that lemons were the best cure for scurvy and, going against prevailing medical opinion, demanded a supply for his ships. He left the Admiralty Board in 1795 and was promoted to full admiral. He commanded a squadron during the Mutiny at Spithead in 1797, and Gardner negotiated directly with the mutineers, until he lost his temper, seized a mutineer by the throat and threatened to hang the lot. This nearly led to his own demise at the hands of the mutineers, but cooler heads prevailed.

In 1800 he became commander-in-chief of the Cork Station. That year he was also created Baron Gardner, of Uttoxeter, in the Peerage of Ireland and in 1806 the title of Baron Gardner in the Peerage of the United Kingdom was created for him. He was briefly commander-in-chief of Portsmouth from March to June 1803 but returned to the Cork Station after that. In a letter dated 19 May 1803 to Lady Hamilton he is referred to by Lord Nelson as a drinker, saying "... I shall get from him as soon as I can for they say there is much drinking...". In 1807 he was made commander-in-chief of the Channel Fleet and he died in office on 1 January 1809.

His memorial in the south transept of Bath Abbey, where he is interred, states that "The post of Major General of the Marine Forces was purposely created and bestowed on him by His most Gracious Sovereign for the very distinguished part He took in the ever Memorable Battle of the 1st of June 1794".

Family

Gardner was born at the Manor House, Uttoxeter, which is commemorated by a plaque. He married Susannah Hyde Gale (2 May 1749 – 20 April 1823) in Kingston, Jamaica on 20 May 1769. She was a Jamaican heiress and the daughter of Francis Gale, a plantation owner, and Susanna Hall. They had nine sons and a daughter. His eldest son, Alan Gardner, 2nd Baron Gardner, became an admiral in the Royal Navy; the second son, Francis, also became an admiral; and the third son William, became a major general. 

Gardner's brother, Major Valentine Gardner, served with the 16th Foot during its service in America from 1767 to 1782, and his son (Gardner's nephew) was Colonel William Linnæus Gardner, a British Indian officer, who created Gardner's Horse in 1809.

Gardner's sister, Dorothea (Dolly) Gardner Barrie, had a son Robert Barrie who by the patronage of his uncle took part in the Vancouver Expedition. Later in life, Barrie would be knighted and become a rear admiral.

Legacy
An East Indiaman was named after Admiral Gardner; it was wrecked on the Goodwin Sands, 24 January 1809. It was carrying a large number of copper 10 and 20 cash coins minted by the East India Company for circulation in the Madras Presidency. The coins were preserved in tightly sealed barrels and large numbers were retrieved around 1986. They are frequently packaged and sold as inexpensive "shipwreck coins."

References 

Attribution
; Endnotes:
 Charnock's Biog. Nav. vi. 583
 Ralfe's Nav. Biog. i. 407
 Foster's Peerage
 Jerdan's National Portrait Gallery

Sources

External links

Alan Gardner, 1st Baron Gardner, illustrations in the National Maritime Museum
Alan Gardner, 1st Baron Gardner, illustrations in the National Portrait Gallery
Alan Gardner at Oxford Dictionary of National Biography
Heart of Oak: Letters from Admiral Gardner (1742–1809), edited Francis Noel Day, 30 September 2015,  – a recently published collection of correspondence

|-

|-

|-

|-

|-

|-

|-

1742 births
1809 deaths
Barons in the Peerage of the United Kingdom
Peers of the United Kingdom created by George III
People from Uttoxeter
Royal Navy admirals
Members of the Parliament of Great Britain for Plymouth
British MPs 1790–1796
British MPs 1796–1800
Members of the Parliament of the United Kingdom for English constituencies
UK MPs 1801–1802
UK MPs 1802–1806
UK MPs who were granted peerages
Barons in the Peerage of Ireland
Peers of Ireland created by George III
Lords of the Admiralty